La Grande-Motte is a commune in the Hérault département in Occitanie in southern France. It is a popular seaside resort and port, built in the 1960s and 1970s. La Grande-Motte is characterized by homogeneous architecture; many of the prominent buildings are pyramidal in form. With 2 million tourists per year it is one of the favorite resorts of the French.

Population

International relations
La Grande-Motte is twinned with:
 Hornsea, England
 Hoyo de Manzanares, Spain

Resort 
The resort town of La Grande-Motte was largely built between 1960 and 1975 on virgin beachfront dunes, and is artificially irrigated to create a green environment. The architect of the project, Jean Balladur, drew inspiration from pre-Columbian pyramids such as Teotihuacan, Mexico; and from modernist architecture in Brazil, especially the work of architect Oscar Niemeyer. Balladur developed the master plan for the seaside resort on a site of 750 hectares comprising 450 hectares of land and 300 hectares of wetland.  The plan included principles for settlement, with guidelines for each plot, including zones for camping, a town centre, a marina, and a city park. The landscaper Pierre Pillet collaborated on the project, selecting plant species that were tolerant of the marine climate. Jean Balladur imagined a green city. Parking was placed no more than 600 meters away from the beach, to allow visitors to walk there, but keeping all development away from the beach itself. The project incorporated large open spaces surrounding the main buildings. Squares and parks, and sports and leisure services were also planned for the new city. Public and private beaches, the marina and water sports facilities complement the design. The Palais de Congrès (conference centre), a casino and the church of St. Augustine are also key elements.

Sports
Sports facilities available in La Grande-Motte include: sailing, jet skiing, swimming and water skiing.

References

Communes of Hérault
Seaside resorts in France
Marinas in France